In a Place Like This is the first LP by the Payolas, released in 1981. The album is only available on vinyl and cassette; it has not been released on CD.

Track listing

Personnel
 Paul Hyde: vocals, rhythm guitar
 Bob Rock: guitars, vocals
 Lawrence Wilkins: bass
 Taylor Nelson Little: drums
 Lee Kelsey: keyboards, vocals

External links
 

1981 debut albums
Payolas albums
Albums produced by Bob Rock
A&M Records albums